Apure Department was one of the departments of Gran Colombia. It was split from the Venezuela Department.

It encompassed 2 provinces - Barinas Province in the north and Achaguas Province in the south.

Departments of Gran Colombia
1824 establishments in Gran Colombia
1830 disestablishments in Gran Colombia